Tomás Herculano de Jesús Regalado Romero (7 November 1861 – 11 July 1906) was the president of El Salvador from 14 November 1898 until 1 March 1903. He was a military ruler and gained power by deposing Rafael Antonio Gutiérrez, a man he had previously helped achieve control of the country by taking part in a conspiracy to oust Carlos Ezeta four years earlier. Elected to a four-year term in 1899, he promoted the construction of railways, declared an amnesty for political exiles, and began the construction of the Santa Ana Theater.

Biography 

Tomás Herculano de Jesús Regalado Romero was born on 7 November 1861 in Santa Ana, El Salvador. His parents were Tomás Regalado and Petrona Romero de Regalado. In 1894, he married Concepción González Fortis, the daughter of ex-Salvadoran President Santiago González Portillo. They had two children: Tomás Regalado González and Marísa Regalado González.

Upon leaving office, he remained active in the Army of El Salvador and was appointed Minister of War by his handpicked successor Pedro José Escalón. During a war against Guatemala in 1906 he led a Salvadoran invasion force and went into battle. Seriously wounded, he soon died on 11 July. His coup d'état led to the dissolution of the Greater Republic of Central America after his government withdrew from it.

Regalado was the last in a series of presidents who had come to power by force during the 19th Century. His peaceful transfer of power to Pedro José Escalón in 1903 allowed for a degree of political stability that persisted until the 1931 Salvadoran coup d'état.

References

Presidents of El Salvador
1861 births
1906 deaths
People from Santa Ana, El Salvador
Leaders who took power by coup
Defence ministers of El Salvador
Salvadoran military personnel